Without a Song: The 9/11 Concert is a 2005 live album by jazz saxophonist Sonny Rollins, recorded in Boston on September 15, 2001.

Reception

Writing for Allmusic, Scott Yanow praised the album, saying it was "arguably Sonny Rollins' best recording of the past decade, and is a highly recommended set", and that "[w]hile many of his detractors feel that his studio recordings since the 1970s have not had the excitement of his live concerts, they should find much to enjoy on this passionate if not flawless set". He concluded that "[h]is playing sounds a bit like a purging of bad memories, while at the same time seeming hopeful about the future."

Track listing
"Without a Song"  – 16:37
"Global Warming"  – 15:16
"Introductions" – 0:59
"A Nightingale Sang in Berkeley Square"  – 10:57
"Why Was I Born?"  – 16:14
"Where or When"  – 12:20

Personnel
Sonny Rollins – tenor saxophone
Clifton Anderson – trombone
Stephen Scott – piano
Bob Cranshaw – electric bass
Perry Wilson – drums
Kimati Dinizulu – percussion

References

2005 live albums
Sonny Rollins live albums
Music about the September 11 attacks
Milestone Records live albums
Instrumental albums